"If" is a song by Pink Floyd on their 1970 album Atom Heart Mother. This song was one of several to be considered for the band's "best of" album, Echoes: The Best of Pink Floyd.

Writing
Written and sung by Roger Waters, like "Grantchester Meadows" before it, "If" carries on a pastoral and folky approach, but instead deals with introspection. The song is in the key of E major.

Live
The song was performed live at a John Peel session on 16 July 1970, at BBC's Paris Theatre, London. Waters performed it on several occasions, during the 1984–85 'Pros and Cons' tour, and in support of Radio K.A.O.S. in 1987. For these performances, "If" was expanded with additional lyrics and chord sequences. The song was later played by Nick Mason's Saucerful of Secrets in 2018, 2019 and 2022 in a medley with Atom Heart Mother.

Reception
In a review for the Atom Heart Mother album on release, Alec Dubro of Rolling Stone gave "If" a negative review, calling the song "English folk at its deadly worst. It's soft and silly." Dubro said the same for "Fat Old Sun". Rolling Stone would later praise the song in 2007, however, writing "Roger Waters' pastoral ballad on this flawed album was a moving examination of the terror of isolation; Floyd were finally rooting their astral travels in true songwriting." In another positive review, Stephen Deusner of Paste described "If" as one of Roger Waters' best compositions. In another positive review, Irving Tan of Sputnik Music believes "If" contains "very introspective lyrics that end up making a memorable outing", but also believed the track was not as well-written as some of his later and earlier pieces. Tan also believed the track was reminiscent of "Grantchester Meadows", another Waters-penned track from Ummagumma a year before.

Personnel
Roger Waters – lead and backing vocals, classical guitar, bass guitar
David Gilmour – slide electric guitar
Richard Wright – Hammond organ, piano
Nick Mason – drums

References

External links

Pink Floyd songs
1970 songs
1970s ballads
Rock ballads
Songs written by Roger Waters
Song recordings produced by David Gilmour
Song recordings produced by Roger Waters
Song recordings produced by Richard Wright (musician)
Song recordings produced by Nick Mason

he:Atom Heart Mother#צד ב'